"Nigger" is the debut single by Swedish metal band Clawfinger. First released on a three-track demo before appearing as the opening track on their 1993 debut album Deaf Dumb Blind, the song was an immediate success for the band, reaching No. 4 on Norway's singles charts and No. 22 in Sweden.

Lead singer Zak Tell has always been adamant that the song contains an anti-racist message, which he emphasises before performing the song live. Clawfinger has performed "Nigger" live over 1,500 times, according to Tell, as the band has never played a show without performing the song. The track's lyrical content has also been described as "provocative and critically relevant." However, controversy surrounding the song has led to the band never playing a concert in North America.

Lyrical content 
Clawfinger frontman Zak Tell wrote the song in 1991 as a 20-year old, wanting to spread an anti-racist message. Tell listened to early hip hop groups including Public Enemy, A Tribe Called Quest and De La Soul growing up, and when writing "Nigger", said, "I was angry and I was slightly confused. I didn't think about what I was 'allowed' to say or not." In 2019, Tell said that "Nigger" was the most important song that he ever wrote.

Clawfinger has never performed in North America because of a threat the band received after the release of "Nigger". The band's record label received a fax in Los Angeles that said, "White guys trying to tell black people how to live their lives should have their balls cut off." This led to the end of Clawfinger's promotion in the United States. To this date, it is the only region that the band has never played. "It would have been quite easy if we had only had one black band member or if the band had been brown, then it wouldn't have been a problem at all," Tell said.

In a 1994 interview with Billboard, Tell said that Americans had misunderstood the song, saying "It was invented by slave traders. I'm telling people I can't quite understand why they would want to use such a word." Historian Todd M. Mealy, in his book The N-Word in Music: An American History, described the message of "Nigger" as "a declaration that the word is and always will be a racial slur, and that Blacks on any continent should refrain from saying it regardless of the connotation."

The provocativeness of Tell's lyrics was influenced by punk rock bands like the Sex Pistols and the Dead Kennedys. Tell continued to combine humour, metal music and what he called "lyrics with a big middle finger" on "The Faggot in You" and "Right to Rape" from the band's 2005 album Hate Yourself with Style. Tell said in 2005, and again in 2019 that he would not write the song the same way nowadays because "there is a different political climate and more political correctness than in the 90s. This song would certainly bring us more trouble today than it did back in 1993."

Track listing 
CD: MVG Records / MVGCDS 7

 "Nigger" – 3:48
 "Get It" – 4:43
 "Love" – 3:01

Chart performance

References 

1993 singles
Rap metal songs